Chunnakam is a town, located  north of Jaffna. It is one of the important commercial centres in Jaffna. The original name of the town was Mayilani. In northern Sri Lanka, Chunnakam is only second to Jaffna in terms of population density and commercial activities in and around its neighbourhoods.

Etymology
According to Tamil scholars, Chunnakam derived from two Tamil words, "Chunnam+Gramam", "Chunnam" means limestone and "Gramam" means village, limestone is widely found in the nearby areas. One of the great Sri Lanka Tamil poets, Kumarasamy pulavar gave a new definition to its name in his poem beginning as முடிவில்லா துறை சுன்னாகத்தான் வழி ... , from which, scholars believe that the rising Sun from the East reflecting on the temple of Siva located on the present day station road, has the impression of seeing a shiny mountain, which is presumably the Heaven, the home of Siva made him to inspire for the poem mentioned above here, சுன்னாகம் can be divided into two parts of nouns as சுல் + நாகம்  = சுன்னாகம், where சுல் means silver and நாகம் means mountain giving the compound noun the meaning as "Shiny Mountain"

It was once suggested that the name Chunnakam was the equivalent of Pali name Cunnagãma. But later suggested that the name may be the Tamil equivalent of the Sinhala name Sulunãgama (Pali: Cullanãgagãma).

History

Historically in the recent centuries Chunnakam has been an area dominated mostly by Sri Lankan Tamils and up until the 1980s there was a small Sinhalese population from the south along with Indian Tamils, Moors, and other South Indian Non-Tamils such as Malayalis lived in Chunnakam area. This ethnic diversity among its residents gave Chunnakam a characteristic of a major city.

Location

Chunnakam is about 5 miles2 in area as it has Punnalaikkadduvan on its East, Uduvil on its South, Sandilipay on its West and Mallakam on its north as bordering villages. Chunnakam has population of about 60,000.

Transport
Chunnakam railway station

Politics
Currently Chunnakam is governed by Valikamam South Divisional Council.
Unlike other places in Northern Sri Lanka, people of Chunnakam also adapted to diversive political beliefs. During the days of Town Council era, residents always preferred candidates from LSSP to Federal party or Tamil congress and in the 1982 presidential election, the then JVP leader Rohana Wijeweera collected majority votes within Manipay constituency from the two poll booths in Chunnakam only.

There was even a popular rumor about Mr. Wijeweera being kept in a secret place in Chunnakam when he was wanted by the Sri Lankan government following the infamous uprising by his men in the late 80's. However, that turned out to be untrue as he was captured in a place in the central province.

Places of worship

There are quite a few worship places within the town limits of Chunnakam.

Hindu temples 
 Sri Kathiramalai Sivan Devasthanam (established by Tamil King UkiraRajasinkan)
 Maylani Annamaar (Annamageswarar) Temple
 Maylani Sivan Temple
 Maylani Murugan Temple
 Mylani Vadali Amman Temple
 Choolani Yana Vairavar Temple
 Paruthikalati Vairavar Temple
 Chunnakam Iyanar Temple
 Chunnakam Pillayar Temple

Christian churches 
 St. Antony's Parish Catholic Church (Chunnakam)
 St. Mary's Catholic Church (Erlalai)
 St. Mary's Catholic Church (Uduvil)

Colleges and schools 
 Ramanathan Academy of Fine Arts -  University of Jaffna
 Ramanathan College, Maruthanarmadam 
 Mylani Saiva Vidyalayam (middle school)
 Nakeswari Vidyasalai (primary school)
 Roman Catholic Mixed School (primary school)
 St. Antony's Kindergarten (operated by St. Antony's Parish)

Notable persons
 Kumaraswamy Pulavar - scholar, poet
 Vetharniam - The founder of Chunnakam
 V. Dharmalingam - Former Member of Parliament, Former Chairman of Uduvil Village Council
 Ponnambalam Nagalingam - Former Chairman of Chunnakam Town Council in the 1960s & Former Senator - Lanka Sama Samaja Party (LSSP)
 D. Siddarthan - Member of Parliament, Leader of the People's Liberation Organisation of Tamil Eelam (PLOTE)
 Paikiasothy Saravanamuttu - Paternal grandson of Vetharniam, The founder of Chunnakam
 Sabdharatnajyoti Saravanamuttu - Paternal grandson of Vetharniam, The founder of Chunnakam
 Ratnasothy Saravanamuttu - Paternal grandson of Vetharniam, The founder of Chunnakam
 Manicasothy Saravanamuttu - Paternal grandson of Vetharniam, The founder of Chunnakam

Notes

Towns in Jaffna District
Valikamam South DS Division
Suburbs of Jaffna